The 1933 Copa de Competencia Final was the final that decided the winner of the 2nd (and last) edition of Copa de Competencia, an Argentine domestic cup organised by the dissident body Liga Argentina de Football, the first professional league of Argentina.

The final was held in the Chacarita Juniors' stadium (located in Villa Crespo) on November 26, 1933. With an attendance of 30,000, Racing Club defeated San Lorenzo 4–0 winning their first Copa de Competencia championship.

Qualified teams

Overview 
This first edition was contested by all of the 18 teams that took part in the Primera División league season in a single elimination format. Racing Club beat River Plate 1–0 at San Lorenzo Stadium), Estudiantes de La Plata 3–1 (at Independiente), Boca Juniors (4–1) and Vélez Sarsfield 1–0 (in the semifinal, at Chacarita Juniors). 

San Lorenzo beat Gimnasia y Esgrima LP 3–2 (at Independiente), lost to Vélez Sársfield 1–4 (at Boca Juniors in the losers group), then defeated Ferro Carril Oeste 1–0 (at Argentinos Jrs.) and beat Talleres de Remedios de Escalada 3–1 (in the semifinal, at Independiente).

Match details

References

c
c
1933 in Argentine football
Football in Buenos Aires